Walnut Mountain is a mountain in Sullivan County, New York. It is located southwest of Liberty. Columbia Hill is located southeast and Chuck Hill is located northwest of Walnut Mountain.

References

Mountains of Sullivan County, New York
Mountains of New York (state)